The Aztec Aquaplex, located on the San Diego State University (SDSU) campus in San Diego, California, USA. The facility is operated and managed by the Associated Students of San Diego State University, which sells passes for access.

Intercollegiate sports
The SDSU Aztecs intercollegiate water polo, swimming and diving teams are based at the Aztec Aquaplex.

Facilities
The facility is situated between Tony Gwynn Stadium, the SDSU Softball Stadium, the Aztec Tennis Center, three football practice fields and the SDSU Sports Deck. The facility is also just behind the Aztec Athletics Center, which allows student-athletes easy access to some of the top training personnel and weightlifting facilities on the West Coast. In addition, Viejas Arena is within walking distance.

Swimming pools
The facility hosts three swimming pools:

Services
Adjacent to the pools is a  building complex with showers, locker rooms, restrooms, administrative offices, member services, storage and support facilities.

See also
 SDSU Aztecs
 San Diego State University

References

External links
 Aztec Aquaplex - official page

College swimming venues in the United States
Sports venues in San Diego
San Diego State Aztecs
San Diego State Aztecs women's water polo
Sports venues completed in 2007
Swimming venues in California